Delwen Lowell Jensen (born June 3, 1928) is an American jurist and former United States district judge of the United States District Court for the Northern District of California.

Education and career

Born in Brigham City, Utah, Jensen received an Artium Baccalaureus degree from the University of California, Berkeley in 1949 and a Bachelor of Laws from the UC Berkeley School of Law in 1952. He was in the United States Army Corporal from 1952 to 1954. He was in private practice in Oakland, California, from 1954 to 1955.

Jensen was a deputy district attorney of Alameda County, California, from 1955 to 1966. He was an assistant district attorney of Alameda County from 1966 to 1969. He was the District Attorney of Alameda County from 1969 to 1981. As district attorney Jensen oversaw prosecutions involving members of the Black Panthers and also the Patty Hearst prosecution.

He was an Assistant United States Attorney General of the Criminal Division of the United States Department of Justice from 1981 to 1983. He was the United States Associate Attorney General from 1983 to 1985, and the United States Deputy Attorney General from 1985 to 1986. In 1987 he was briefly considered for FBI director, but he withdrew his name from consideration.

Federal judicial service

Jensen was a federal judge on the United States District Court for the Northern District of California. Jensen was nominated by President Ronald Reagan on June 2, 1986, to a seat on the United States District Court for the Northern District of California vacated by Judge William Horsley Orrick Jr. He was confirmed by the United States Senate on June 24, 1986, and received his commission on June 25, 1986. He assumed senior status on June 27, 1997. He retired from the court on October 31, 2014.

References

Sources
 
 Civil Rights Greensboro: D. Lowell Jensen profile, uncg.edu; accessed June 8, 2017.

1928 births
Living people
American prosecutors
Judges of the United States District Court for the Northern District of California
People from Brigham City, Utah
United States Army soldiers
United States Assistant Attorneys General for the Criminal Division
United States Associate Attorneys General
United States Deputy Attorneys General
United States district court judges appointed by Ronald Reagan
20th-century American judges
UC Berkeley School of Law alumni